Dorcadion seminudum is a species of beetle in the family Cerambycidae. It was described by Kraatz in 1873. It is known from Armenia and Azerbaijan.

References

seminudum
Beetles described in 1873